Anthony Cannataro (born July 1965) is the acting Chief Judge of the New York Court of Appeals, serving since September 1, 2022. He has served as an associate judge of the same court since his 2021 appointment by then-Governor Andrew Cuomo. Cannataro previously served as the chief administrative judge of the New York City Civil Court from 2018 to 2021 and as a judge on various New York City courts from 2012 to 2021.

Early life and education 

Cannataro was born in July 1965 in New Jersey. He earned a Bachelor of Arts in the Classics from Columbia University in 1993 and his Juris Doctor from New York Law School in June 1996.

Legal and judicial career 

Cannataro was the principal law clerk to Judge Carmen Beauchamp Ciparick of the New York Court of Appeals from 2000 to 2003 and principal law clerk to Judge Lottie E. Wilkins of the New York Supreme Court from 2003 to 2011. From 2012 to 2017 he was elected to serve as a judge of the New York City Civil Court. From 2012 to 2014 he was designated a judge of the New York Family Court for Kings County, New York. From 2014 to 2015 he was a judge of the New York City Civil Court for The Bronx. From 2015 to 2016 he was designated an acting Supreme Court Justice for the New York Supreme Court. From 2016 to 2018, he was appointed a supervising judge for the New York City Civil Court. In 2017 he was elected to the New York Supreme Court to serve in the civil term. From 2018 to 2021, he served as an administrative judge of the New York City Civil Court after being appointed by chief administrative judge Lawrence K. Marks.

New York Court of Appeals service 

Cannataro was one of seven candidates submitted to the governor in April 2021. On May 25, 2021, Governor Andrew Cuomo announced Cannataro as a nominee to be an Associate Judge of the New York Court of Appeals, filling the seat vacated by the retirement of Judge Paul Feinman on March 23, 2021. He was confirmed on June 8, 2021, and took office the same day. His formal investiture ceremony took place on April 5, 2022. Cannataro is the second openly gay judge to have served on the New York Court of Appeals.

Personal life 

Cannataro was born to parents who emigrated from Italy. He and his husband live in Washington Heights, Manhattan.

See also 
 List of LGBT state supreme court justices in the United States
 List of LGBT jurists in the United States

References

External links 

Biography at nycourts.gov

|-

1965 births
20th-century American lawyers
21st-century American judges
21st-century American LGBT people
Chief Judges of the New York Court of Appeals
Columbia College (New York) alumni
American gay men
Judges of the New York Court of Appeals
LGBT appointed officials in the United States
LGBT judges
LGBT lawyers
LGBT people from New York (state)
Living people
New York (state) Democrats
New York (state) lawyers
New York (state) state court judges
New York Law School alumni
Place of birth missing (living people)
American people of Italian descent